(), sometimes translated as outrageous dress in English, is an ancient Chinese concept with a negative connotation which was employed to refer to any garment items or clothing-style which was considered as being "strange clothing style" or "deviant dressing styles", or "aberrance in clothing" when compared to what was considered appropriate in the traditional Chinese clothing, system. It was also associated with fast changes in fashion styles. The concept of  has appeared since the second century BC and its theoretical basis are derived from the Yin and yang principle as well as the Wuxing. The appearance of  clothing was often associated with political and ecological upheaval. This concept of  continued to be used even in the Qing dynasty.

Cultural significance

Evil connotation, disaster, and bad omens 
In ancient China, what was considered an appropriate form of clothing was based on the seasons, occasions, and more importantly the wearer's identity, including social status. The concept of  has appeared since the second century BC in the 《》and already had a negative connotation:

In ancient China, being dressed in  clothing-style was understood as a form of social confusion in the way one dresses himself; for example, being dressed against what was prescribed by the rules and regulations and therefore having no consideration in the distinction between the higher and lower status; or wearing clothing-style which shows transgression in gender and/or sexuality norms. This was also attested in the  《》where it is stated that:

Even in the Qing dynasty,  fashion continued to be discussed and be condemned; it also appears in the poem, 《The Bell of Qing Poetry》, written in 1869 by Xia Zhisheng:

Political upheaval 
Wearing  fashion could also be perceived as being inauspicious as it was associated with political upheaval; this can be found in the 《》, a source which was most cited in the Qing dynasty, which stated:

Garment of living people mixed with mourning attire 
 could also refer to clothing of living people which had adopted mixed elements from the mourning attire even when there was the absence a close deceased relative.

Blurred distinction between Chinese and non-Chinese fashion 
Xia Zhisheng of the Qing dynasty also explained that  which was mixed non-Chinese fashion was associated with the foretelling of ominous events:

Fast changes in fashion 
The term  could sometimes be used to position a garment or style which popular but contrasting to the traditional style.

Characteristics 
Fashion or clothing-style which were characterized as being  typically had the following characteristics:

 Form of clothing violates ritual norms and clothing regulations
 Form of clothing which were extravagant and luxurious,
 Form of clothing which violated the yin and yang principle, and
 Strange and inauspicious form of clothing.

List of  garment or dressing style

Ming dynasty 

  was introduced in the Ming dynasty from Joseon; it was considered  as it went against the order of Heaven and Earth.

Qing dynasty 

 In the mid-late Qing dynasty, both officials and scholars lamented that there was an increasing consumption of silk among the members of the lower status, such as actors, courtesans, servants, which was thus considered a  fashion since this behaviour went against the Confucians virtues of frugality and simplicity.

See also

References 

Hanfu
Chinese traditional clothing
Fashion
Fashion aesthetics
Concepts in aesthetics
Cultural trends
History of clothing